The 1994–95 season was the 94th season in Athletic Bilbao's history and their 64th consecutive season in La Liga, the top division of Spanish football.

Season summary

The previous season, Athletic's German head coach Jupp Heynckes had guided them to a fine 5th-place finish in La Liga. This was their best finish for six years, and qualified them for the first round of the 1994–95 UEFA Cup after five seasons without European competition. However, Heynckes accepted an offer in July to return to his homeland with Eintracht Frankfurt, leaving his Spanish employers searching for a new coach. New President José María Arrate turned to Racing Santander coach Javier Irureta, a successful Athletic player in the 1970s, who was duly appointed as the new head coach.

Their UEFA Cup first round opponents were Anorthosis Famagusta of Cyprus, and things did not get off to a good start, with a 2–0 away defeat in the first leg. However, by half time in the return leg, Athletic were on level terms, and an 89th-minute goal from Genar Andrinúa was enough for them to sneak into the second round. They again lost the first leg, this time 3–2 in England against Newcastle United. The home leg again provided an escape, although the margin was even tighter: a solitary goal from Cuco Ziganda saw Athletic progress on away goals. In the third round, they faced Italian side Parma. This time, the first leg was at home, and they won 1–0, again courtesy of Ziganda. However, the pattern of the first two rounds was mirrored in the second leg as Parma pulled off a 4–2 victory at Stadio Ennio Tardini to eliminate their Basque rivals.

On 18 March, Athletic lost 2–0 at San Mamés to Sevilla, a result which left them in 11th place in the league, with just nine wins from their 26 matches. The club had seen enough, and Irureta was dismissed the following day. Another former Athletic player, Athletic Bilbao B coach José María Amorrortu, was appointed as caretaker manager until the end of the season.

Amorrortu's first match in charge was the second leg of the Copa del Rey quarterfinal against Deportivo La Coruña. Athletic carried a 3–0 deficit from the first leg, so the 0–0 draw at San Mamés saw them eliminated, although this marked their best cup run since reaching the same stage three years earlier. Amorrortu's appointment did improve their league form, however, and they recovered to finish 8th. At the end of the season, Yugoslavian Dragoslav Stepanović, formerly in charge of German club Bayer Leverkusen, was appointed as Irureta's permanent replacement.

Squad statistics

Appearances and goals

|}

Results

La Liga

League table

UEFA Cup

First round

Athletic Bilbao won 3–2 on aggregate

Second round

Newcastle United 3–3 Athletic Bilbao on aggregate. Athletic Bilbao won on away goals rule

Third round

Parma won 4–3 on aggregate

See also
1994–95 La Liga
1994–95 Copa del Rey
1994–95 UEFA Cup

References

External links
 

Athletic Bilbao
Athletic Bilbao seasons